This is a list of aviation-related events from 1961.

Deadliest crash
Two crashes claim the joint title of 1961's deadliest plane crash. The first took place on 10 May, when Air France Flight 406, a Lockheed L-1649 Starliner was destroyed by a terrorist bomb over the Sahara desert in Algeria, killing all 78 people on board. The second, an accident, took place on 1 September when TWA Flight 529, a Lockheed L-049 Constellation, crashed shortly after taking off from Midway Airport in Chicago, Illinois, U.S., also killing all 78 people on board.

Events 
 During the year, Aeropostal Alas de Venezuela (LAV) introduces the Douglas DC-8 into service to replace its Lockheed Super Constellations.

January
 January 1
East Germany establishes its national civil aviation authority, the Hauptverwaltung der Zivilen Luftfahrt (Central Administration for Civil Aviation). 
Two hijackers commandeer a Cubana de Aviación Bristol Britannia 318 after it departs Havana, Cuba, and force it to fly them to New York City.
 January 3 – Aero Flight 311, a Douglas DC-3C (registration OH-LCC) of the Finnish airline Aero, crashes near Kvevlax (Koivulahti) on approach to Vaasa Airport in Finland killing all 25 people on board. An investigation determines pilot error to be the cause of crash, finding that the captain and first officer were both exhausted for lack of sleep and were intoxicated at the time of the crash. It remains the deadliest air disaster to have occurred in Finland.
 January 12 –  At the Air Force Flight Test Center at Edwards Air Force Base, California, the crew of a United States Air Force Strategic Air Command B-58 Hustler led by Major E. J. Deutschendorf – the father of singer-songwriter John Denver – breaks six world records in a single flight, including five held by the Soviet Union. The flight also breaks the world speed records for average speed over the same distance carrying a 1,000-kilogram (1,610-pound) payload and carrying no payload and smashes the previous records for the distance in all three payload categories, which had been held by Soviet Tupolev Tu-104s flying at about half the average speed the B-58 achieves. The flight also sets a new record for average speed over a 1,000-km (621 mph) course, averaging .
 January 14 – At the Air Force Flight Test Center at Edwards Air Force Base, California, a U.S. Air Force Strategic Air Command B-58 Hustler sets a new world speed record for a flight carrying a 2,000-kilogram (4,409-pound) payload over a  course, averaging . The flight also breaks the world speed records for average speed over the same distance carrying a 1,000-kilogram (1,610-pound) payload and carrying no payload. On February 28, the crew will receive the Thompson Trophy for the flight.
 January 24 – A United States Air Force B-52G Stratofortress carrying two Mark 39 thermonuclear bombs breaks up in mid-air over Faro, North Carolina, and crashes, killing three of its eight-man crew. The bombs do not arm themselves and one bomb is recovered.

February
 February 1 – Trans-Canada Air Lines becomes the first sustained operator of the Vickers Vanguard.
 February 3 – Operation Looking Glass commences, giving the United States Air Force′s Strategic Air Command a permanent, airborne command post.
 February 15 – Sabena Flight 548, a Boeing 707, crashes at Brussels, Belgium. All 72 aboard (including the entire 18-member United States Figure Skating team), as well as one person on the ground, are killed. It is the first fatal accident involving the Boeing 707 and the deadliest accident in the history of Sabena.

March
 March 7 – Flying a North American X-15, U.S. Air Force Major Robert M. White becomes the first pilot to exceed Mach 4.
 March 14 – A U.S. Air Force B-52F Stratofortress carrying two nuclear weapons crashes in Sutter County, California, west of Yuba City. The weapons do not arm and the eight-man crew ejects safely, although a firefighter responding to the crash is killed and several people are injured in a road accident.
 March 28
Air Afrique is formed.
President John F. Kennedy cancels the North American B-70 Valkyrie bomber program. The production order for B-70s is cut to three (later reduced to two) XB-70A aircraft for experimental use in studying sustained flight at speeds of greater than Mach 3 and in the advanced study of aerodynamics, propulsion, and other subjects related to large supersonic transports.

April
 Seaboard & Western Airlines changes its name to Seaboard World Airlines.
 April 1
VIASA – the flag carrier of Venezuela – commences operations.
The United States Air Force redesignates its Air Research and Development Command as the Air Force Systems Command. It also redesignates the Air Materiel Command as the Air Force Logistics Command, with some of its functions transferred to the Air Force Systems Command.
 April 3 – In Chile's worst air disaster in history at the time, LAN Chile Flight 210, a Douglas DC-3 carrying 24 people, including eight members of the Chilean football (soccer) team Club de Deportes Green Cross, disappears over the Andes Mountains in Chile during a domestic flight from Osorno to Santiago. Its wreckage will remain undiscovered until February 2015.
 April 7 – Moisture condensing in a connector plug causes a GAR-8 Sidewinder air-to-air missile carried by a New Mexico Air National Guard F-100A Super Sabre of the 188th Fighter Interceptor Squadron to fire accidentally while the F-100A is practicing bomber interception tactics against the U.S. Air Force B-52B Stratofortress Ciudad Juarez of the Strategic Air Commands 95th Bombardment Wing. The missile blows off the B-52Bs port wing, and the bomber crashes on Mount Taylor in New Mexico, killing three members of its crew.
 April 12 – Soviet cosmonaut Yuri Gagarin makes the first human spaceflight, orbiting the Earth once in 108 minutes in Vostok 1.
 April 15 – In Operation Puma, eight Douglas B-26B Invaders painted in Cuban Air Force markings manned by anti-Castro Cuban exiles of the Fuerza Aérea de Liberación ("Liberation Air Force") fly from Puerto Cabezas, Nicaragua, to attack airfields at San Antonio de los Baños and Ciudad Libertad, Cuba, and Antonio Maceo Airport at Santiago de Cuba. They destroy a mixture of Cuban Air Force aircraft – a C-47 Skytrain, a PBY Catalina, five B-26 Invaders, a Hawker Sea Fury, a T-33 Shooting Star, and two P-47 Thunderbolts, among others – and a number of civilian aircraft, including a Douglas DC-3. One attacking B-26 is shot down by antiaircraft fire at Havana and its crew is lost; two B-26s land in Florida, and one in the Cayman Islands and are not returned to the Cuban exiles.
 April 17 – Anti-Castro Cuban exiles invade Cuba at the Bay of Pigs. Five C-46 Commandos and one C-54 Skymaster drop a battaltion of their paratroopers into Cuba, losing one C-46, and later parachute supplies to exile troops ashore, while the remaining B-26 Invader bombers of their Fuerza Aérea de Liberación – some flown by Central Intelligence Agency contractors and personnel of the Alabama Air National Guard – provide close air support near the beachhead. The invading exiles shoot down two Cuban Sea Furies and two Cuban B-26 Invaders with antiaircraft fire. The Cuban Air Force has only six operational aircraft, but two of its Hawker Sea Furies sink two of the exiles five ships and drive off the rest and its only two jets – T-33 Shooting Star trainers – shoot down four Fuerza Aérea de Liberación B-26 Invaders. The exiles B-26s and C-54s continue to support the beachhead the following day. United States Navy ships supporting the exiles include the anti-submarine warfare carrier  and the helicopter assault carrier , and the attack aircraft carrier  is active near the Cayman Islands, but their aircraft see no combat, limiting their activities to combat air patrol, reconnaissance, and search and rescue flights.
April 19 – Six A4D-2 Skyhawk attack aircraft from Attack Squadron 34 (VA-34) aboard USS Essex fly a combat air patrol over the exiles beachhead at the Bay of Pigs, to protect Fuerza Aérea de Liberación B-26 Invaders providing close air support there, but a mix-up over time zones leads two of the B-26s – manned by Central Intelligence Agency contractor personnel – to arrive after the Skyhawks have departed; they are shot down by two Cuban T-33 Shooting Stars, with their crews killed. The exiles in the beachhead surrender later in the day. The Cuban Air Force has suffered four aircraft shot down and at least five destroyed on the ground during the invasion, while the exiles have lost seven B-26 Invaders with the loss of 10 Cubans and four Americans aboard them, and one C-46 and its crew.
 April 24 – The Tupolev Tu-114 airliner makes its first passenger flight, a domestic Aeroflot flight in the Soviet Union from Moscow's Vnukovo Airport to Khabarovsk.

May
 May 1 – The first hijacking of an American airliner – and first aircraft hijacking inside the United States – takes place, when Antulio Ramirez Ortiz, flying under the pseudonym "Elpirata Cofresi" – a reference to Puerto Rican pirate Roberto Cofresí – and armed with a gun and a steak knife, commandeers National Airlines Flight 337, a Convair CV-440 bound from Miami International Airport in Miami, Florida, to Key West, Florida, with 10 people on board. He explains that the president of the Dominican Republic, Rafael Trujillo, has offered him US$100,000 to assassinate President of Cuba Fidel Castro, and that he must fly to Havana, Cuba, to warn Castro. It is the first time that an American airliner has been forced to fly to Cuba, and surprised and confused Cuban air traffic controllers at first threaten to have the plane shot down if it enters Cuban airspace, but they eventually allow it to land at a military base outside Havana. Ortiz receives political asylum in Cuba.
 May 3 – The Boeing Airplane Company changes its name to Boeing Company.
A helicopter retrieves Ross from the water and transports him safely to the anti-submarine warfare carrier , but Prather subsequently slips from a helicopter's sling and drowns after his pressure suit floods.
 May 5 – NASA astronaut Alan Shepard becomes the first American in space onboard Freedom 7 which features the first manual control of spacecraft orientation and the safe landing of the crew while within the spacecraft; the latter making it the first "completed" human spaceflight mission based on strict interpretation of past World Air Sports Federation's definitions.
 May 10 – A United States Air Force B-58 Hustler sets a record for sustained supersonic flight, flying  in 30 minutes 45 seconds at an average speed of 1,302 miles per hour (1,132 knots; 2,097 km/hr). Its pilot, Major Elmer E. Murphy, will receive the Aéro-Club de France′s Blériot Cup for the flight.
 May 18 – In Operation Sageburner, a United States Navy McDonnell F4H-1F Phantom II fighter (BuNo. 145316) is destroyed trying to set the low-altitude speed record, the aircraft coming apart at high speed due to a pitch bellows failure which causes a pilot-induced oscillation (PIO).
 May 22 or 24 – To celebrate the 50th anniversary of naval aviation in the United States, five United States Navy McDonnell F4H-1F Phantom II fighters fly across the United States in less than three hours in Operation LANA. They receive the 1961 Bendix Trophy for their flight.
 May 26 – A U.S. Air Force B-58 Hustler flies from New York City to Paris in a record 3 hours, 19 minutes, 41 seconds, covering the 4,612-mile (7,427-km) distance at an average speed of 1,386 miles per hour (1,205 knots; 2,232 km/hr). Its crew will receive the Mackay Trophy for the flight.
 May 30 – Viasa Flight 897, a Douglas DC-8-53, crashes in the Atlantic Ocean during a flight from Lisbon, Portugal, to Santa Maria Island in the Azores, killing all 61 people on board.

June
 June 1 – United Air Lines absorbs Capital Airlines, completing a merger announced in July 1960. The largest airline merger in history at the tine, it makes United the largest airline in the Western world, with a fleet of 267 aircraft.
 June 6 – Air Congo is founded as the national airline of the Republic of the Congo (Léopoldville).
 June 12 – KLM Flight 823, a Lockheed L-188 Electra, crashes on approach to Cairo International Airport in Egypt, killing 20 of the 36 people on board and injuring all 16 survivors.
 June 15 – El Al sets a world record for the longest non-stop commercial flight when one of its Boeing 707 airliners flies from New York City to Tel Aviv, covering  in 9 hours 33 minutes.
 June 21–22 – A Royal Air Force Avro Vulcan makes the first non-stop flight from England to Australia.
 June 23 – U.S. Air Force Major Robert M. White becomes the first pilot to achieve hypersonic – speeds higher than Mach 5 – flight, reaching Mach 5.27 ( in North American X-15 56-6671.
 June 29 – Air Congo begins flight operations.

July
 July 1 – The Royal Air Force deploys Hawker Hunter combat aircraft to reinforce Kuwait, which is under threat from Iraq. Simultaneously it deploys Canberras and Valiant aircraft to Malta.
 July 3 – Fourteen hijackers commandeer a Cubana de Aviación Douglas DC-3 on a domestic flight in Cuba from Havana to Varadero and force it to fly them to Miami, Florida.
 July 11 – United Airlines Flight 859, a Douglas DC-8, strikes several ground vehicles and catches fire while landing at Stapleton International Airport in Denver, Colorado. Of the 122 people on board, 18 are killed and 84 injured. One person on the ground also dies.
 July 19
Trans World Airlines becomes the first airline to show regularly scheduled movies during its flights, presenting By Love Possessed to first-class passengers.
 July 21 – Alaska Airlines Flight 779, a Douglas DC-6 cargo plane operating under contract to the United States Air Force′s Military Air Transport Service, strikes an embankment just before landing at Shemya Air Force Base on Shemya in the Aleutian Islands in Alaska and crashes, killing the entire crew of six.
 July 24
 A hijacker commandeers Eastern Air Lines Flight 202, a Lockheed L-188 Electra bound from Miami to Tampa, Florida, with 38 people on board and forces it to fly to Havana, Cuba. A United States Air Force fighter aircraft from Homestead Air Force Base, Florida, tails the airliner until it enters Cuban airspace.
Deliveries of the McDonnell CF-101 Voodoo to the Royal Canadian Air Force commence.
 July 31 – As Pacific Air Lines Flight 327 – a Douglas DC-3 –  prepares for departure at Chico Airport in Chico, California, for a flight to San Francisco, California, a drunken man, 40-year-old Bruce Britt, runs across the tarmac and enters the plane without showing a ticket. He pulls out a .38-caliber revolver and shoots a ticket agent in the back, wounding him, then fires two more shots in the airliner's cabin before the pilots admit him to the cockpit. He says he wants to be flown to Smackover, Arkansas, to see his estranged wife and demands that the pilot take off. When the pilot refuses to do so until the cockpit door is closed, Britt shoots him in the face, blinding him for life. The copilot then disarms him and subdues him with the help of three passengers.

August
 August 3 – Armed with handguns, Leon Bearden – a convicted bank robber with many financial and psychological problems who wishes to present Cuba′s leader Fidel Castro with a Boeing 707 and make a fresh start in Cuba – and his 16-year-old son Cody hijack Continental Airlines Flight 54, a Boeing 707-124 (registration N70775) with 73 people on board while it is flying from Phoenix, Arizona, to El Paso, Texas, where the Beardens release all the passengers except for four who volunteer to remain aboard as hostages. Under orders from President John F. Kennedy to prevent the airliner from leaving Texas, the Federal Bureau of Investigation and Continental Airlines make sure that refueling the plane faces endless delays, until Leon Bearden fires a shot and orders the flight crew to take off. Federal agents spray the plane with machine gun as it begins to roll, shredding its tires and disabling one of its engines. An FBI negotiator then boards the plane and subdues the Beardens.
 August 4 – The United States Senate holds an emergency hearing on the recent outbreak of aircraft hijackings in the United States. Asked whether the Federal Aviation Administration (FAA) had considered searching all airline passengers before boarding, FAA head Najeeb Halaby rejects the idea as impractical, saying "Can you imagine the line that would form from the ticket counter in Miami if everyone had to submit to police inspections?"
 August 9
The British Eagle Vickers 610 Viking 3B Lord Rodney, carrying a crew of three and taking 34 boys from a London school and two of their masters to a camping holiday crashes at Holta in Strand, Norway, killing all 39 people on board. It is the deadliest aviation accident in Norwegian history at the time.
 Armed with a revolver, Albert Charles Cadon hijacks Pan American World Airways Flight 501 – a Douglas DC-8 flying from Mexico City, Mexico, to Guatemala City, Guatemala, with 81 people on board – and forces it to fly him to Havana, Cuba, as a protest against the failure of the United States Government to support the independence movement in French Algeria.
 Five hijackers attempt to take control of a Cubana de Aviación Curtiss C-46 Commando about five minutes after it takes off from Havana with 53 people on board for a flight to Nueva Gerona, Cuba. Two guards aboard try to stop them, and the pilot, a guard, and a hijacker die in an exchange of gunfire. The copilot then makes an emergency landing in a sugar cane field near Havana, during which the airliner's landing gear collapses, and the four surviving hijackers flee.
 August 10 – The United States Senate votes 92–0 in favor of a bill making airplane hijacking a crime punishable by death.
 August 13 – A Curtiss C-46F transport plane operated by the CIA's Air America airline suffers a mechanical problem and crashes near Pha Khao in Laos, killing all 5 crew members on board while they were on a mission to drop supplies for General Vang Pao's Hmong army.
 August 15 – Beagle Aircrafts first completely original design – the B.206X, an early prototype of the Beagle Basset – flies for the first time.
 August 16 – The British Overseas Airways Corporation (BOAC) sells its ownership stake in Middle East Airlines.
 August 21 – A Canadian Pacific Air Lines Douglas DC-8 sets two world records during a single test flight.
 August 28 – In Operation Sageburner, a United States Navy McDonnell F4H-1F Phantom II fighter (BuNo. 145307) sets a low-altitude speed record, averaging  over a 3-mile (4.82-km) course flying below  at all times.
 August 29 – A French military aircraft clips a cable of the aerial tramway connecting Pointe Helbronner and the Aiguille du Midi in the French Alps. Three cars of the tramway fall, killing five people. The pilot lands his plane safely.
 August 31
Tunisair takes delivery of its first jet airliner, a Sud Aviation Caravelle III.
Chance Vought Incorporated and Ling-Temco Electronics merge to form Ling-Temco-Vought, Inc.

September
 September 1 – Trans World Airlines Flight 529, a Lockheed L-1049 Super Constellation, crashes near Hinsdale, Illinois, shortly after takeoff from Midway Airport in Chicago, Illinois, killing all 78 people on board. It is the deadliest single-aircraft aviation accident in American history at the time.
 September 5 – President of the United States John F. Kennedy signs legislation making aircraft hijacking a federal crime in the United States.
 September 12
The experimental V/STOL Hawker Siddeley P.1127 makes its first transitions from vertical to horizontal flight and back, using thrust vectoring.
Air France Flight 2005, a Sud Aviation Caravelle, crashes  short of the runway while on approach to land in bad weather at Rabat-Salé Airport in Morocco, killing all 77 people on board.
 September 14 – Two West German Air Force F-84F Thunderstreak fighters stray off course into East German airspace. Pursued by a large number of Soviet Air Force fighters, the two West German planes manage to evade them in heavy cloud cover and land in West Berlin unharmed.
 September 17 – Due to a maintenance error, Northwest Orient Airlines Flight 706, a Lockheed L-188 Electra, crashes on takeoff from O'Hare International Airport in Chicago, Illinois, killing all 37 people on board.
At the time, it is the deadliest aviation accident ever to have taken place in what would later become Zambia.
 September 23 – A Turkish Airlines Fokker F27 Friendship 100 crashes into the hill Karanlıktepe in Ankara Province while on approach to Esenboğa Airport in Ankara, Turkey, killing 28 of the 29 people on board.
 September 24 – During an air show at Wilmington, North Carolina, a United States Air Force C-123 Provider carrying members of the United States Army Parachute Team (the Golden Knights) crashes on take-off and burns. Three of the 15 servicemen on board die.

October
 Prompted by the dissolution of the United Arab Republic, Syria ends its association with United Arab Airlines (the future EgyptAir), and a new Syrian airline, Syrian Arab Airways, begins operating the route network that its predecessor Syrian Airways had operated before its March 1958 merger into United Arab Airlines. 
 Tunisair inaugurates service between Tunis, Tunisia, and Frankfurt-am-Main, West Germany.  
 October 7 – The Derby Aviation Douglas Dakota IV G-AMSW crashes on Pic de Canigou in the Catalan Pyrenees in southern France, killing all 34 people on board.
They do survive the blast, but the shock wave from the explosion forces the Tu-95V to drop .

November
 The United States Air Force begins its Farm Gate counterinsurgency training mission in South Vietnam, teaching Republic of Vietnam Air Force personnel at Bien Hoa Air Base to fly T-28 Trojan trainer aircraft.
 November 1 – The first Hawker Siddeley 748 to be built in India flies for the first time. It has been assembled at Kanpur by the Indian Air Forces Aircraft Manufacturing Depot as India seeks to replace its fleet of Douglas Dakotas.
 November 8 – The crew of Imperial Airlines Flight 201/8, a Lockheed L-1049 Constellation chartered by the United States Army to carry new recruits to Columbia, South Carolina, for training, mishandles fuel flow problems to the aircrafts starboard engines, then attempts an emergency landing at Byrd Field in Richmond, Virginia, where the airliner crashes. Although all 79 people on board survive the impact, all but the captain and flight engineer die of carbon monoxide poisoning after they are trapped in the fuselage during a post-crash fire.
 November 9
A North American X-15 flown by U.S. Air Force test pilot Major Robert M. White becomes the first airplane to exceed Mach 6, achieving Mach 6.04 (4,094 mph, 6,593 km/h) at an altitude of 102,000 feet (31,090 meters) during a flight of under 8 minutes between Mud Lake, Nevada, and Edwards Air Force Base, California.
 Flying the SUMPAC (Southampton University Man-Powered Aircraft) at Lasham Airfield in Hampshire, England, Derek Piggott makes the first officially documented takeoff and landing in a human-powered aircraft.
 November 10 – Six opponents of Prime Minister of Portugal António de Oliveira Salazar hijack a TAP Portugal Lockheed L-1049G Super Constellation with 39 people on board during a flight from Casablanca, Morocco, to Lisbon, Portugal, and force it to circle over Lisbon while they drop propaganda leaflets urging the Portuguese people to revolt against Salazar. They then force the airliner's crew to fly them to Tangier, Morocco.
 November 14 – A Zantop Air Transport Douglas DC-4 cargo aircraft on final approach to Greater Cincinnati Airport in Hebron, Kentucky, crashes in a wooded area near the airport. Two of the three-man crew are injured.
 November 22
 The first aircraft carrier designed as such to be completed in France, Clemenceau, is completed at the Brest Arsenal at Brest.
 November 23 – Aerolíneas Argentinas Flight 322, a de Havilland DH 106 Comet 4, strikes eucalyptus trees immediately after takeoff from Viracopos-Campinas International Airport in Campinas, Brazil, and crashes. Its fuel tanks explode, and all 52 people on board die.
 November 25 – The United States Navy commissions its first nuclear-powered aircraft carrier, .
 November 27 – Five armed students hijack an Avensa Douglas DC-6B with 43 people on board during a domestic flight in Venezuela from Caracas to Maracaibo and force it to circle over Caracas while they drop anti-government propaganda leaflets over the city. They then force the airliner's crew to fly them to Curaçao in the Netherlands Antilles.
 November 30 – Ansett-ANA Flight 325, a Vickers Viscount Type 720, crashes into Botany Bay just after takeoff from Sydney, Australia, killing all 15 people on board.

December
 December 11 – The first American military aircraft are based in Vietnam, as the U.S. Armys 8th and 57th Transportation Companies (Light Helicopter), arrive at Saigon, South Vietnam. They are equipped with 32 H-21C Shawnee transport helicopters.
 December 22 – U.S. Army helicopters engage in their first combat operation in Vietnam as the 8th Transportation Company makes several airlfits of South Vietnamese ground troops to landing zones in South Vietnam south of Saigon.

First flights 
 Champion Lancer

January
 January 24 – Convair 990
 January 26 - Fiat 7002

February
 February 15 - Victa R-2
 February 28 - Cessna 336 Skymaster

March
 March 4 - Armstrong Whitworth AW.660 Argosy - Argosy C.1 for RAF
 March 18  – Tupolev Tu-28
 March 28 - Stewart Headwind

April
 April 5 – Dassault Mirage IIIE
 April 16  – Beagle Airedale G-ARKE
 April 27 - Legrand-Simon LS.60
 April 29 - Potez 840 F-WJSH

May
 May 2 – Pilatus PC-6 Turbo-Porter

June
 June 1 - Breguet 941
 June 17 – HAL Marut
 June 21 – Aviation Traders Carvair G-ANYB
 June 22 – Beechcraft Queen Air Model 80

July
 July 11 – Lightning F.2, second production model of the English Electric Lightning
 July 16 – Hiller Ten99

August
 August 15 – Beagle B.206X, five-seat early prototype of the Beagle Basset
 August 16 – YUH-1D (Bell Model 205), prototype of the UH-1D Iroquois
 August 17 – Handley Page HP.115

September
 September 7 – PZL M-4 Tarpan
 September 9 – Bölkow Bo 103
 September 21 – Boeing CH-47 Chinook

October
 October 12 – Dassault Mirage IVA pre-series (second prototype)
 October 21 – Breguet Atlantic
 October 23 – Beech Model 23 Musketeer

November
 November 2 – Bensen B-12
 November 9 – SUMPAC (Southampton University Man-Powered Aircraft)
 November 16 – HMPAC Puffin

Entered service 
 Westland Wessex with the Royal Navy

April
 April 24 - Tupolev Tu-114 Rossiya (NATO reporting name "Cleat") with Aeroflot

June
 North American A3J-1 Vigilante (redesignated A-5A Vigilante in 1962) with United States Navy Heavy Attack Squadron 3 (VAH-3)

September
 Sikorsky HSS-2 Sea King (redesignated SH-3 Sea King in 1962) with United States Navy Antisubmarine Helicopter Squadrons 3 (HS-3) and 10 (HS-10)

October
 McDonnell F4H-1 Phantom II (redesignated F-4B Phantom II in 1962) with United States Navy Fighter Squadron 74 (VF-74)

Retirements 
 Hiller ROE Rotorcycle by the United States Marine Corps

References 

 Duffy, Paul and Andrei Kandalov. Tupolev The Man and His Aircraft. Shrewsbury, UK: Airlife, 1996. .
 Taylor, John W. R. Jane's All The World's Aircraft 1961–62. London: Sampson Low, Marston & Company, Ltd., 1961.
 Taylor, John W. R. Jane's All The World's Aircraft 1962–63. London: Sampson Low, Marston & Company, Ltd., 1962.

 
Aviation by year